Latcholassie Akesuk (1919–2000) was an Inuk sculptor.

Early life and family 
He was born in 1919, on Anatalik Island in the Northwest Territories. His father Akesuk Tudlik (1890–1966) was a renowned sculptor, as was his brother, Solomonie Tigullaraq. His granddaughter Saimaiyu Akesuk (born 1988) is also a sculptor.

Career 
He began carving alongside his father in the early 1950s, and was particularly influenced by his father's owls.

He carved using the green stone common on Dorset Island around Kinngait. His work is held in a variety of museums, including the National Gallery of Canada, the Museum of Inuit Art, the University of Lethbridge Art Collection, and the University of Michigan Museum of Art.

Later life 
He died in 2000, in Cape Dorset, now Kinngait.

References 

Artists from the Northwest Territories
1919 births
2000 deaths
20th-century Canadian sculptors
Inuit sculptors
Inuit from the Northwest Territories
Canadian male sculptors
20th-century Canadian male artists